William De Vere Noonan (28 February 1917 – 17 September 1980) was an Australian rules footballer who played with Collingwood in the Victorian Football League (VFL).

Football
He later played for Oakleigh in the Victorian Football Association (VFA).

Military service
Noonan's career was interrupted by his service in the Australian Army during World War II, where he served in New Guinea and was a leading member of the Wau Wombats football team in the services football competition.

Death
He died at his home in McKinnon, Victoria on 17 September 1980.

Notes

References

External links 

Bill Noonan's playing statistics from The VFA Project
Profile from Collingwood Forever

1917 births
1980 deaths
Australian rules footballers from Victoria (Australia)
Collingwood Football Club players
Oakleigh Football Club players
People from Euroa
Australian Army personnel of World War II
Military personnel from Victoria (Australia)